Protium is a genus of more than 140 species of flowering plants in the family Burseraceae. It is native to the Neotropics (where around 175 species have been found), Madagascar, Papua New Guinea, Indonesia and southern Asia from Pakistan east to Vietnam. The genus had been included in Bursera, but is distinct, being most closely related to Crepidospermum and Tetragastris.

In their native range, some species are grown for timber, used as firewood, as medicinal plants, for their fruit, their resin (Copal) or in other cultural contexts.

Selected species
 Protium almecega March.
 Protium apiculatum Sw.
 Protium aracouchini
 Protium asperum
 Protium attenuatum
 Protium connarifolium
 Protium copal
 Protium correae
 Protium decandrum
 Protium elegans
 Protium gigantium
 Protium guianense
 Protium hebetatum Daly
 Protium heptaphyllum Mart.
 Protium icicariba (= Icica icicariba)
 Protium inconforme
 Protium obtusifolium (Lam.) Marchand (= Dammara graveolens)
 Protium panamense
 Protium pittieri
 Protium serratum
 Protium widgrenii Engl.

Uses
 Caranna, medicinal gum

References

 Flora of Pakistan (treats species in the genus Bursera)

 
Burseraceae genera
Taxa named by Nicolaas Laurens Burman